The Government College of Engineering, Keonjhar (abbreviated GCE Keonjhar or GCEKJR), is a public higher education institute located in Keonjhar, Odisha, India, focusing on education and research in various fields of Engineering. The institute was established in 1995 as the Orissa School of Mining Engineering, Degree Stream  and was renamed to GCE Keonjhar in 2012.

It is the only Government College in the Odisha offering B.Tech. in Mining Engineering and Mineral engineering. The State government has initiated steps for developing it  into a centre of excellence (CoE) in Earth science and technology.

History
The Government College of Engineering, Keonjhar was established in 1995 as the Orissa School of Mining Engineering (Degree Stream), Keonjhar. It was originally focused on Mining Engineering but has since expanded to include Electrical Engineering, Mechanical Engineering, Mineral Engineering, Metallurgical & Materials Engineering, Computer Science & Engineering, and Civil Engineering. In 2006, the college became a constituent college of Biju Patnaik University of Technology, Rourkela. In 2011, it was declared a full-fledged government engineering college, and in 2012 it was renamed to GCE Keonjhar. In 2017, the National Cadet Corps (NCC) was introduced at the institute as an extra-curricular activity, giving students the opportunity to serve the armed forces. In 2021, it became an autonomous institute along with PMEC, Bramhapur and GCE, Kalahandi.

Campus

GCE Keonjhar is located at the foothills of the Gandhamardhan mountain near Judia Ghat. The campus is on a 45 acres plot of land around 5 km from Keonjhar town in Kendujhar District with NH 49 & NH 20 running along its two sides.

Halls of residence
Most students of GCE Keonjhar reside in the hostels (referred to as halls of residence) on-campus.

The halls of residence are:
Baldevjew Hall of Residence
Gandhamardan Hall of Residence
Maa Tarini Hall of Residence (girls' hostel)

All halls of residence accommodate three students in one room. Each hall of residence has a mess, a Common room with TV  & a sports room for indoor sports. Baldevjew Hall of Residence has a well equipped Gymkhana. Students are provided with 24 hour Internet facility.

Organisation and administration

Departments
The academic departments in GCE Keonjhar include the following:

Civil Engineering	
Computer Science & Engineering	
Electrical Engineering
Mechanical Engineering
Metallurgical and Materials Engineering	
Mineral engineering	
Mining Engineering
Science and Humanities

Academics

Admission
Students are admitted in Undergraduate Engineering Programs through the JEE-Main and Lateral Entry through OJEE. The admission procedure is as per BPUT norms and is strictly governed by OJEE. Some seats are reserved for Diploma holders in Engineering as per the rules of SCTE & VT, Odisha and DTET.

Undergraduate programs
The institute offers undergraduate B.Tech degrees in seven technical disciplines with an intake capacity of 60 each: Civil Engineering, Computer Science & Engineering, Electrical Engineering, Mechanical Engineering, Metallurgical and Materials Engineering, Mineral Engineering and  Mining Engineering.

Training and placement
The Training and Placement cell provides placement assistance to the students. Personality development programs, group discussions, seminars, etc. are convened from time to time. Companies are invited for on-campus selections through the institution's industrial link ups. Companies visit the college to recruit students. Training and placement liaise with companies for the summer training programmes.

Student life
Utkarsh is the annual techno cultural festival of GCE Keonjhar. It is a three-day fest which is typically held in March. The fest consists of concerts and band performances, competitive gaming, singing and dance competitions and various other cultural activities.

Clubs and societies
The institute hosts numerous clubs that are active throughout the year. The list of currently active clubs and societies include:
 Club Innovare
 Dance And Music Club
 Robotics and Automation Club (RAW)
 Photographic Club (Foresight)
 Society of Mining and Exploration
 Computer Society of India Student Branch 
 Civil engineering society
 Society of Mechanical Advancements (SMA) 
 Innovatory Electrical Society
 Society of Metallurgical and Materials Engineering Innovation and Technology (SMMEIT)

References

External links 
 Official site

All India Council for Technical Education
Schools of mines in India
Engineering colleges in Odisha
Colleges affiliated with Biju Patnaik University of Technology
Kendujhar district
Educational institutions established in 1995
1995 establishments in Orissa